Abha Parmar is an Indian actress. She is known for her role in the soap opera Iss Pyaar Ko Kya Naam Doon?, Neeli Chhatri Wale and Yeh Un Dinon Ki Baat Hai.

Television

Films

References

External links
 

Actresses from Madhya Pradesh
Indian film actresses
Year of birth missing (living people)
Living people
Indian television actresses
Actresses in Hindi cinema
Actresses in Hindi television
21st-century Indian actresses